The following are members of Sigma Alpha Mu:

Martin Agronsky, political journalist and commentator, recipient of DuPont-Columbia Award
Marv Albert, sports commentator for NBC
Ronald S. Baron, an American mutual fund manager and investor, founder of Baron Capital
Daved Benefield, professional American football player who played 13 seasons in the Canadian Football League (CFL) 
Dave Bing, Mayor of Detroit, Michigan, former NBA player, and Detroit businessman
Neil Bluhm, real estate and casino magnate, partner of Midwest Gaming & Entertainment
Albert Boscov, businessman, philanthropist, and long-time chairman and CEO of Boscov's Inc.
Maurice Brodie, polio researcher
LeVar Burton, actor
Michael Chasen, co-founder and former CEO of Blackboard Inc.
Ernie Davis, 1961 Heisman Trophy winner
Thomas Downey, Member of the U.S. House of Representatives
Bob Dylan, singer-songwriter, musician and artist
Jamie Eldridge, Massachusetts State Senator 
Bernie Fine, Syracuse Orange men's basketball assistant coach
Donald Fehr, Executive Director of the National Hockey League Players Association
Sam Fox, United States Ambassador to Belgium
Donald A. Glaser, Nobel laureate in Physics
Paul Michael Glaser, actor and director
Dan Glickman, Secretary of Agriculture
Harry Glickman, founder and President of the NBA's Portland Trail Blazers
Stanley Gold, lawyer, investment company executive, and philanthropist
Leonard Goldenson, Chairman of ABC
Steve Goodman, folk music singer-songwriter  
Jonathan D. Gray, president and chief operating officer of Blackstone Group
Hank Greenberg, Major League Baseball Hall of Fame player
Maurice R. Greenberg, Chairman and CEO of American International Group
Jim Hartung, US Olympic gold medal gymnast
Irwin M. Jacobs, Chairman and co-founder of Qualcomm Inc. (QCOM); pioneered CDMA technology
Joshua Jay, magician, author, and lecturer
Adam Kellerman, Australian wheelchair tennis player
Jon Landau, producer of the films Titanic and Avatar
Tom Lantos, Member of the U.S. House of Representatives
Bora Laskin, former Chief Justice of Canada
Eric Lefkofsky, founder of Tempus and the co-founder of Groupon, Echo Global Logistics (ECHO), InnerWorkings (INWK), and Mediaocean
Earle I. Mack, businessman and former US Ambassador to Finland
Bernard Madoff, former stockbroker, investment advisor, financier, and white collar criminal
Morris Marx, former President, University of West Florida
Michael Milken, financial executive for Drexel Burnham Lambert; UC Berkeley
Don Most, actor, from television sitcom Happy Days
Dikembe Mutombo, NBA player 
Matthew Pittinsky, co-founder of Blackboard Inc
Ronald Rabin, Member of the North Carolina State Senate
Alan Rafkin, Emmy Award-winning television director, producer, and actor
Michael E. Reiburn (1893–1982), New York assemblyman and state senator, disbarred lawyer, convicted of theft and fraud
Mark Rosenker, Chairman, National Transportation Safety Board (NTSB) and Major General USAF (Ret.)
Philip Roth, author
Alan Rothenberg, President of the US Soccer Federation
Marshall Rothstein, Canadian Supreme Court Justice
Ibraheem Samirah, Member of the Virginia House of Delegates
Danny Schayes, NBA player
Adam Schefter, sports writer, television analyst, and the NFL Insider for ESPN
Gerry Schwartz, co-founder of CanWest Global Communications, founder and CEO of Onex Corporation, Director of Scotiabank
Ron Silver, actor, starred in Blue Steel and Timecop; former President of the Screen Actors Guild
Walt Singer, college football player at Syracuse University, and professional football player in the National Football League for the New York Giants
Ed Snider, owner of the Philadelphia Flyers
David Stern, Commissioner of the NBA
Preston Robert Tisch, businessman; chairman and part owner of the Loews Corporation 
Zollie Volchok, President of NBA Seattle SuperSonics
Bram Weinstein, sportscaster; Washington Commanders radio broadcast crew
Les Wexner, Chairman of The Limited, Structure, Bath and Body Works, and Express
Andrew Wilkow, conservative political talk radio host
Art Wrubel, private equity investor 
Steve Wynn, owner of the Wynn Las Vegas, former owner of Golden Nugget, and former owner and developer of Mirage, Treasure Island, and Bellagio Casinos and Resorts in Las Vegas, Nevada
George Zimmer, entrepreneur; founder and former Executive Chairman of the Men's Wearhouse

References

Sigma Alpha Mu
brothers